Lily of the Dust is a 1924 American silent drama film directed by Dimitri Buchowetzki, starring Pola Negri, produced by Famous Players-Lasky, and distributed by Paramount Pictures. This movie was based on the 1908 novel The Song of Songs (German: Das hohe Lied) by Hermann Sudermann and the 1914 Broadway play The Song of Songs by Edward Sheldon.

This film is a remake of the American silent film The Song of Songs (1918).

Cast

Production
Negri was happy working with director Buchowetzki, who had also directed her in Men (1924) and in the German film Sappho (1921), which had been released in the U.S. as Mad Love, as her performances turned out well in his films. Buchowetzki would later direct her once more in the romantic drama film The Crown of Lies (1926).

Preservation
With no copies of Lily of the Dust located in any film archives, it is a lost film.

References

External links

Lily of the Dust lobby poster
Stills at silentfilmstillarchive.com

1924 films
1924 drama films
Silent American drama films
Remakes of American films
American silent feature films
Films directed by Dimitri Buchowetzki
Films based on works by Edward Sheldon
Films based on works by Hermann Sudermann
Films based on German novels
American films based on plays
Films based on adaptations
Films set in Germany
Films set in the 1900s
Famous Players-Lasky films
Lost American films
Films based on multiple works
Sound film remakes of silent films
American black-and-white films
1924 lost films
Lost drama films
1920s American films